The Palmach Museum is a museum located in Ramat Aviv, Israel dedicated to the Palmach, the strike-force of the pre-state underground Haganah defense organization, which was later integrated into the Israel Defense Forces.

History
Opened in 2000, the Palmach Museum commemorates the contribution of the Palmach to the creation of the State of Israel. It was designed by Israeli architects Zvi Hecker and Rafi Segal.

The museum is an underground series of multi-media experience chambers, starting with a memorial for the fallen.

See also
 List of museums in Israel

References

External links 

 Encounters- The Palmach History Museum
 The Palmach House

Monuments and memorials in Israel
Museums established in 2000
Museums in Tel Aviv
Military and war museums in Israel
History museums in Israel
2000 establishments in Israel
Zvi Hecker buildings
Palmach